Lampet or lapet (pronounced lappet)  is a typical and traditional Batak snack from Tapanuli, North Sumatra, Indonesia.

Preparation
This cake is usually shaped like a pyramid and wrapped in banana leaves. The cooking process is not complicated. It starts with rice flour and grated coconut that is not too old. These are mixed together. Following that, grated palm sugar and water is added, turning it into a dough. After flattening the dough it is wrapped in banana leaves and steamed until cooked. The process for making this cake is almost like making an ombusombus cake.

See also

 Arsik
 Sasagun

External links 
 Lappet dan ombusombus 
 kulinologi 
 news group

References

Batak cuisine